The Retaruke River is a river in the North Island of New Zealand. It joins with the Whanganui River at Whakahoro just above Wade's Landing and downstream from Taumarunui. The river flows through the farming communities of Upper and then Lower Retaruke Valley. Downstream from this junction is the Mangapurua Landing with its Bridge to Nowhere, servicing the ill-fated Mangapurua Valley farming community.

Source
The river initially flows south west through the forest before bending to flow north west.

Geology 
Most of the valley is made up of Early Miocene Mahoenui Group rocks. About 65,000 years ago movement of the Waimarino Fault probably allowed capture of the Waimarino Stream and/or Makatote River by the Manganuiateao River, which would have reduced erosion by ending the incidence of lahars and reducing flows in the Retaruke River. 

Coal was discovered in 1909 in the Late Miocene Whangamomona Group and, during the 1960s and 1970s, an opencast coal mine operated at the top end of Retaruke Road. Between 1938 and 1984 it produced about 3,000 tons of coal.

Upper Retaruke valley community 

Then 1 kilometre up the Upper Retaruke Valley road is the location of the annual Kaitieke Collie club sheepdog trials.   Next is the location of a "Victory Hall". Further up the valley there was a coal mine, and it was along the upper Retaruke river that fossil whalebones were found by Ken McNaught.

Kaitieke County 
The Retaruke valley is contained within the original Kaitieke County.

This county was created by the Kaitieke County Act 1910 from portions of Waimarino and West Taupo Counties. Other settlements in the county included Manunui, Raurimu, Ōwhango, Kakahi, and Piriaka. Manunui Town Board was split from the county in 1911 and the county became part of Taumarunui County in 1956.

The Kaitieke Council Chambers were located at Raurimu near the old Raurimu District High School.

The Kaitieke County stock yards are located at the junction of the Upper and Lower Retaruke Roads . There stands the World War I memorial, a set of stock yards for auctioning of sheep stock, and a defunct manual telephone exchange.  Previously in near proximity of the stock yards there was a postal depot, a general store and then an automatic telephone exchange.

Lower Retaruke valley community 
Portions of the Lower Retaruke Valley were settled about 1900 by government run farm ballot.  Other portions were independently purchased from the Māori community.  The land was then cleared, grassed, and sheep flocks herded in from Raurimu to stock the hills.

The valley previously had a tiny Mangaroa Primary School().  At a location further up there still remain the community hall and sports field, here there are annual children's Christmas parties, occasional Dances/Social and the annual Retaruke Easter Sports Day are run.

Access to the Valley is via three main roads: Oio Road, Kawautahi Road or the Raurimu-Kaitieke Road from Raurimu.  However, on foot the valley can be accessed via the old Mangapurua Road, or by jetboat or via the Whanganui River.  (Other access routes such as the Kokako Road & Kuotoroa East Road (to Ruatiti), Te Mata Road from Whakahoro to Taumarunui have long since been abandoned.  Some of these roads were examples of pack horse tracks that were expanded to roads during the Great Depression 1930s as job creation schemes.)

Historically the wealth of the valley has come from the production of wool.  Early on there were also some small dairy farms producing cream/"butterfat" for the Kaitieke dairy factory that was located in Piriaka near Taumarunui.

Reserves 
The Retaruke valley has several scenic reserves. Hautonu , Papapotu , Ngataumata , Ngamoturiki  and Rotokahu  were gazetted in 1913 and Ngamoturiki  in 1979. The original vegetation was mainly rimu, rata, tawa, hinau, rewarewa, hard beech, and kamahi. Since about 1960 many kamahi around the headwaters of the river have died. The highest and steepest hills in the Retaruke catchment have residual tawa-dominated stands or secondary growth of kamahi and some kanuka and rewarewa. The rest of the valley was largely converted from native bush to pasture in about 40 years from the 1880s.

Tributaries

References

Rivers of Manawatū-Whanganui
Rivers of New Zealand